Ustad Badruddin "Manji" Khan (1888–1937) was a Hindustani Classical vocalist of the Jaipur-Atrauli Gharana founded by his father, Ustad Alladiya Khan. "He was called 'Manji' because he was his father's Manjhala (middle) son."

Early life
Utd. Manji Khan was the second son of Ustad Alladiya Khan. "Because of the health ailments of his other two brothers, elder Ustad Nasiruddin 'Badeji' Khan and younger Ustad Shamsuddin "Bhurji" Khan, Ustad Manji Khan was treated and chosen by Ustad Alladiya Khan as the foremost inheritor and disciple of the Jaipur-Atrauli gharana."

Musical style and training
Ustad Manji Khan was influenced by Ustad Rahimat Khan, a popular vocalist at the time, of the Gwalior Gharana. The influence of Ustad Rahimat Khan's style in Ustad Bhurji Khan's singing earned him the wrath of his father, and thus gave up singing for a while. He resumed it later, under his father's conditions, but his career was cut short by his early death.

"Ustad Manji Khan was noted for his serene face while singing, and earned popularity amongst younger listeners because of his choice to punctuate the more serious classical fare with exquisitely sung lighter pieces."

Students
Mallikarjun Mansur became Ustad Manji Khan's disciple just before Khan's death. Later, Mansur learned under Ustad Alladiya Khan's youngest son Ustad Bhurji Khan. Gulubhai Jasdanwalla also learned from Ustad Manji Khan for several years.

"It was through the initiative of a friend that Ustad Manji Khan, son of Ustad Alladiya Khan of the Jaipur gharana noticed Mallikarjun. Already trained in the Gwalior gharana style, Mallikarjun was able to absorb the rich Jaipur style." Pandit Mansur is Ustad Manji Khan's sole musical inheritor.

Death
Ustad Manji Khan died an untimely death in 1937.

Legacy
Like his famous father, Ustad Manji Khan did not leave behind any recordings.

References

Further reading

1888 births
1937 deaths
Indian Muslims
20th-century Indian male classical singers
Hindustani singers
Indian music educators
Vocal gharanas
Jaipur gharana
Singers from British India
20th-century Khyal singers